Sulfur (or sulphur) is a chemical element with symbol S and atomic number 16.

Sulfur or sulphur may also refer to:

Biology
 Coliadinae, a subfamily of butterflies commonly known as the sulphurs or yellows
 Dercas, a genus of Coliadinae commonly called the sulphurs
 Colias, a genus of Coliadinae commonly called the sulphurs (in North America) or clouded yellows (elsewhere)
 Phoebis, a genus of Coliadinae that is not itself called the sulphurs but that contains a number of species which are

Geography

Canada
 Sulphur, Yukon

United States
 Sulphur, Indiana
 Sulphur, Kentucky
 Sulphur, Louisiana
 Sulphur, Nevada
 Sulphur, Oklahoma
 Sulphur, South Dakota
 Sulphur, Bowie County, Texas
 Sulphur, Trinity County, Texas
 Sulphur Peak (Utah)
 Sulphur River, in Texas and Arkansas
 Sulphur Spring, a geyser in Yellowstone National Park

Various
 Sulphur Creek (disambiguation)
 Sulphur Mountain (disambiguation)
 Sulphur Springs (disambiguation)

Music
 Sulfur (band), a 1990s American rock band
 Sulfur (EP), by Gnaw Their Tongues, 2013
 "Sulfur" (song), by Slipknot, 2009
 "Sulfur", a song by Katatonia from Teargas, 2000

Other uses
 Sulfur (magazine), an American literary magazine 1981–2000
 Sulfur (pharmacy), pharmaceutical uses of sulfur
 Fedora 9, codenamed Sulphur, a Linux distribution

See also

 Isotopes of sulfur
 Sulfur cycle, a biogeochemical cycle
 Sulpher, a musical group composed of Rob Holliday and Steve Monti
 Sulpher, a character in the video game Mana Khemia
 S (disambiguation)

Animal common name disambiguation pages